Dmytrivka is a village in Bolhrad Raion, Odesa Oblast, Ukraine. It belongs to Horodnie rural hromada, one of the hromadas of Ukraine.

References

Villages in Bolhrad Raion
Akkermansky Uyezd